Electric Dreams Software was a UK-based video game publisher established in 1985 by Activision and run by Rod Cousens and Paul Cooper formerly of Quicksilva . The company published video games for the ZX Spectrum, Commodore 64, Amstrad CPC and the Atari 8-bit family of computers  between 1985 and  1989, becoming one of the top eight UK software houses of that decade.

Software Studios
The publisher's in-house video game developer was Software Studios, set up in April 1986 and run by John Dean and Dave Cummings. Software Studios also handled Activision's products marketed in countries outside the United States. The concept behind this team was to pool resources and ideas between all Electric Dreams projects, but they were also directly responsible for two film tie-in licenses, Aliens: The Computer Game (1986) and Big Trouble in Little China.

The company's initial releases were Riddler's Den and I, Of the Mask.

List of releases
Riddler's Den (1985), David Harper
I, of the Mask (1985), Spaceman Ltd
Back to the Future (1985), Software Images
Winter Sports (video game) (1985), Software Images
Zaxxon (1985); under license from Sega
Aliens: The Computer Game (1986), Software Studios
Big Trouble in Little China (1986), Software Studios
Dandy (1986), The RamJam Corporation
Explorer (1986), The RamJam Corporation
Hijack (1986), Paradise Software
Mermaid Madness (1986), Soft Design
Prodigy (1986), MD Software
Spindizzy (1986), Paul Shirley and Phil Churchyard
Xarq (1986), The RamJam Corporation
Aliens: US Version (1987), Mr. Micro
Firetrack (1987), Aardvark Software
FireTrap (1987), Source Software; under license from Data East USA
Nihilist (1987), Shahid Ahmad
RMS Titanic
Starblade (1986), Bob Duncan and Gary Stark
Star Raiders II (1987), Simon Freeman, Gary Stark and Bruce Poelman; under license from Atari
Super Sprint (1987), Software Studios; under license from Atari
Tempest (1987), David Pridmore; under license from Atari
Super Hang-On (1986), Software Studios; under license from Sega
Championship Sprint (1988), Catalyst Coders; under license from Atari
Karnov (1988), Mr. Micro; under license from Data East USA
R-Type (1988), Manfred Trenz and Andreas Escher; under license from Irem
Incredible Shrinking Sphere (1989), Foursfield
Wicked (1989)
Millennium 2.2 (1989), Ian Bird

References

Video game publishers
British companies established in 1985
Video game companies established in 1985
Video game companies disestablished in 1989
Defunct video game companies of the United Kingdom